CIYMS Hockey Club is a hockey club based at C.I.Y.M.S. Sports Club, Circular Road, Belfast. Home fixtures are played on a sand-filled artificial surface. The club was founded in 1896 as Cliftonville and was one of the founding members of the Ulster Hockey Union. The 1st XI currently plays in the Ulster Senior League. The first reported match was played against North Down at Comber in November 1896 where an eight-goal to nil loss was recorded. In 2018, the club changed its name to CIYMS.

Grounds

The club's origins lie in the Cliftonville area of north Belfast. The club played games at Solitude before finding a permanent home with the Cliftonville Cricket Club at the Cliftonville Cricket Ground on the other side of the Cliftonville Road.

In late August 1972, the clubhouse was burned and looted during civil unrest. Physical sectarian intimidation prevented the members from entering the grounds. The club sought help without success from local and government authorities, in the hope that the club could be protected and assisted in the continue playing hockey and cricket at the ground. As a result, the club abandoned the ground and took up a nomadic existence.Cliftonville Cricket Club web archive

The first grounds used in exile were the Girls' Model School pitches at Dunkeld Gardens. In 1981, the club moved to Boucher Road Playing Fields. Then, in 1986, the Boucher Playing Fields were closed and Cliftonville moved to the Queen's University pitches until taking over the tenancy of Belfast YMCA all-weather pitch at Bladon Drive in 1987.

In 1992, the decision was made that all 1st XI home games would be played on the artificial pitch at the Olympia Leisure Centre.

The club found a new permanent home with CIYMS Sports Club at Belmont in 2004.

Today the historic original ground is the property of the Belfast City Council and is used by the local community but not for cricket or hockey.

1960s and 1970s

Between 1945, when competitive hockey resumed after World War II, and 1962 the club did not win any senior trophies. Indeed, the 1st XI were relegated from the Ulster Senior League to Qualifying League in 1958–59. The team won promotion straight back and over the next twenty years enjoyed its best and most consistent period of success.

In 1963–64, the 2nd XI won the Irish Junior Cup, this has proved to be the only success in this competition.

The Ulster Senior League was won seven times between the 1966–67 and 1975–76 seasons, and they were runners-up in 1965–66, 1969–70 and 1974–75. The Anderson Cup and Kirk Cup were also won in this period.

The Irish Senior Cup was won in 1974–75 and 1975–76, for only the second and third time in the club's history. This led to qualification to play in the European cup-winners' competition.

Honours

 Irish Senior Cup (3 wins)
 1931–32, 1974–75, 1975–76.
 Irish Junior Cup (1 win)
 1963–64.
 Ulster Senior League (9 wins)
 1906–07, 1928–29, 1930–31, 1966–67, 1967–68, 1968–69, 1972–73, 1973–74, 1975–76.
 Ulster Senior League 2 (1 win)
 2014–15.
 Kirk Cup (6 wins)
 1903–04, 1911–12, 1929–30, 1930–31, 1967–68, 1968–69.
 Anderson Cup
 1929–30, 1931–32, 1936–37, 1961–62 (incomplete)
 Sussex Regiment Cup (2 win)
 2014–15, 2015–16, 2016–17.

Sources

External links
Cliftonville Hockey Club

Field hockey clubs in Northern Ireland
Sports clubs in Belfast
1896 establishments in Ireland
Field hockey clubs established in 1896